Ma'bar Sultanate, unofficially known as the Madurai Sultanate, was a short lived  kingdom based in the city of Madurai in Tamil Nadu, India. The sultanate was proclaimed in 1335 in Madurai led by the Jalaluddin Ahsan Khan declared his independence from the Delhi Sultanate. Ahsan Khan and his descendants ruled Madurai and surrounding territories until 1378 when the last sultan, Ala-ud-Din Sikandar Shah fell in battle against the forces of the Vijayanagara Kingdom. During this short span of 43 years, the Sultanate had 8 different rulers.

Origins

The founder Jalaluddin Ahsan Khan was a Sayyid native of Kaithal, Haryana, of the same descent of the Muslim historian Ziauddin Barani.

In 1325, Fakhruddin Jauna Khan acceded to the throne in Delhi as Muhammad bin Tughluq. His plans for invading Persia and Khorasan bankrupted his treasury and led to the issuing of token currency. This led to counterfeiting and further worsened the sultanate's finances. He was unable to pay his huge army and the soldiers stationed in distant provinces revolted. The first province to rebel was Bengal and Ma'bar soon followed. The Governor of Ma'bar, Jalaluddin Ahsan Khan declared independence and set up the Madurai Sultanate. The exact year of founding of the Madurai Sultanate is not clear. Numismatic evidence points to 1335 CE as the founding year. The Persian historian Firishta however places the year of Ma'bar's revolt as 1340 CE.

This short lived Muslim dynasty  at Madurai came into existence following the decline of the Second Pandyan empire, and ruled Madurai, Trichinopoly and parts of South Arcot, for the next 43 years, first as feudatories of the Delhi Sultanate and later as independent monarchies lasting until 1378. The Madurai Sultanate was destroyed by the rise of Vijayanagara, later followed by the Madurai Nayaks.

A rich merchant from the Ma'bar Sultanate, Abu Ali (P'aehali) 孛哈里 (or 布哈爾 Buhaer), was associated closely with the Ma'bar royal family. After falling out with them, he moved to Yuan dynasty China and received a Korean woman as his wife and a job from the Mongol Emperor; the woman was formerly 桑哥 Sangha's wife and her father was 蔡仁揆 채송년 Ch'ae In'gyu during the reign of 忠烈 Chungnyeol of Goryeo, recorded in the Dongguk Tonggam, Goryeosa and 留夢炎 Liu Mengyan's 中俺集 Zhong'anji. 桑哥 Sangha was a Tibetan.<--!>

Jalal-ud-Din Ahsan Khan 
Jalaluddin Ahsan Khan declared independence from Delhi Sultanate around 1335 CE. His daughter was married to the historian Ibn Battuta and his son Ibrahim was the purse bearer of Muhammad bin Tughluq. When Tughluq heard of Jalaluddin's rebellion he had Ibrahim killed in retaliation. Jalaluddin is variously referred to as "Syed", "Hasan" or "Hussun" by the historians Firishta and Ziauddin Barani. Tughluq tried to conquer the Tamil region, known in Muslim chronicles as Ma'bar back in 1337 CE. But he fell ill at Bidar on the way to Ma'bar and had to return to Deogiri. His army was defeated by Jalaluddin. Jalaluddin was killed by one of his nobles in 1340 CE.

Ala-ud-Din Udauji and Qutb-ud-Din Firuz
After Jalaluddin's murder, Ala-ud-Din Udauji Shah took power in 1340 CE. He was succeeded by his son in law Qutb-ud-Din Firuz Shah, who in turn was assassinated within forty days of taking power. Qutbuddin's killer Ghiyas-ud-din Dhamagani took over as Sultan in 1340.

Ghiyas-ud-Din Muhammad Damghani
Ghiyasuddin was defeated by the Hoysala king Veera Ballala III at first, but later managed to capture and kill Ballala in 1343 CE during the siege of Kannanur Koppam. Ghiyasuddin captured Balalla, robbed him of his wealth, had him killed and his stuffed body displayed on the walls of Madurai. Ghiyasuddin died in 1344 CE from the after effects of an aphrodisiac.

Ibn Battuta's chronicles
During his reign, Ibn Battuta, the Muslim Moroccan  explorer known for his extensive travels through Africa and Asia, visited his court while on his way to China. He married Jalaluddin Ahsan Khan's daughter. His travel notes mention Ghiyas-ud-Din Muhammad Damghani's atrocious behaviour towards the local population. His army under his personal orders had the habit of frequently rounding up the local villagers, indiscriminately impaling them on sharpened wooden spikes and leaving them to die. These accounts of were published in a travelogue that has come to be known as The Rihla (lit. "Journey"). This History is also displayed in Ibn Battuta Mall Dubai

Nasir-ud-Din Mahmud Damghan Shah 
Ghiyasuddin was succeeded by his nephew Nasir-ud-Din Mahmud Damghan Shah, reportedly a soldier who originated from Delhi. He fled Hindustan and joined his uncle in Madurai. He upon ascension quickly started dismissing and killing many of the officers and nobles and various political enemies who were likely to disturb his possession of the throne. He too fell into decline and was killed in a short time.

Rule
From contemporary historical accounts, the rulers of Madurai Sultanate come across as tyrants and persecutors of Hindus. Both Ibn Batutta's and Gangadevi's accounts contain graphic descriptions of atrocities committed by the Sultans on the Hindu population.

Ibn Batuta describes Ghiyasuddin Dhamgani's actions as:

Gangadevi's Madhura Vijayam declares the Muslim rule to be the pain to the three worlds:

On the condition of Madurai under the Muslim rule, Gangadevi writes:

Ibn Batuta describes a plague afflicting Madurai:

Gangadevi agrees with the Ibn Battuta on the prevalence of unnatural death:

Decline

Between 1344 and 1357 CE, the Madurai Sultanate went into a decline due to infighting and the rise of Vijayanagar in the North. This is inferred by the lack of any coinage issued during this period. However coins from 1358 to 1378 bearing the names of three Madurai Sultans – Shams-ud-Din Adil Shah, Fakhr-ud-Din Mubarak Shah and Ala-ud-Din Sikandar Shah – have been found. This indicates an interruption of the Indian Muslim power during 1344–57 CE and a brief revival during 1357–78 CE.

Fall
The Vijayanagara Empire under Bukka Raya I made a series of efforts to conquer South India. There were a series of Vijayanagaran invasions in the middle of the fourteenth century which succeeded in initially restricting and finally ending the Madurai Sultanate's rule over South India. Historian John Bowman says that Bukka Raya  annexed  Madurai to his Karnata Empire|Karnata empire]]'s south in 1360 CE. Vijayanagar's armies were led by Bukka's son, Kumara Kampana. Kampana first subdued the Sambuvaraya dynasty in present-day Kanchipuram district, then a vassal of Delhi Sultanate who refused to aid the Madurai conquest and then conquered Madurai. Bowman states that the Ma'bar Sultanate was conquered by Kumara Kampana in 1370 CE. Kampana's invasion has been chronicled in the Sanskrit epic poem Madura Vijayam ("The Conquest of Madurai") or Vira Kamparaya Charithram ("History of Kampana"), written by Kampana's wife Gangadevi. Kampana's victory is symbolised by the restoration of the Srirangam temple to its old glory in 1371 CE. Vijayanagara formally declared Madurai to be its possession during Harihara II's rule in 1378 CE.

Shahs of Madurai

Gallery

Notes

Bibliography

 
 

 
 
 
 

Tamil history
History of Tamil Nadu
Empires and kingdoms of India
History of Madurai
Former sultanates
Islamic rule in the Indian subcontinent
History of Tiruchirappalli